Statistics of Division 2 in the 1974–75 season.

Overview
It was contested by 35 teams, and Valenciennes and Nancy won the championship.

League tables

Group A

Group B

Championship play-offs

|}

Promotion play-offs

|}

References
France - List of final tables (RSSSF)

Ligue 2 seasons
French
2